The 2016 CBA Playoffs is the postseason tournament of the Chinese Basketball Association's 2015–16 season.

Bracket
Teams in bold advanced to the next round. The numbers to the left of each team indicate the team's seeding, and the numbers to the right indicate the number of games the team won in that round. Teams with home court advantage are shown in italics.

First round
All times are in China standard time (UTC+8)

(1) Liaoning Flying Leopards vs. (8) Zhejiang Golden Bulls

(2) Xinjiang Flying Tigers vs. (7) Beijing Ducks

(3) Sichuan Blue Whales vs. (6) Zhejiang Lions

(4) Guangdong Southern Tigers vs. (5) Shandong Golden Stars

Semifinals
All times are in China standard time (UTC+8)

(1) Liaoning Flying Leopards vs. (4) Guangdong Southern Tigers

(2) Xinjiang Flying Tigers Vs. (3) Sichuan Blue Whales

Finals

(1) Liaoning Flying Leopards Vs. (3) Sichuan Blue Whales

The series was noted for having a brawl that occurred after the third match of the finals between the Liaoning and Sichuan teams.

Chinese Basketball Association playoffs
playoffs